Harlesden is a Network Rail station on Acton Lane in northwest London, served by London Overground and by London Underground Bakerloo line trains. The railway line here is the border between the Harlesden and Stonebridge residential area in the east, and the Park Royal industrial estate to the west. The southern end of Willesden Brent Sidings separates the station from the West Coast Main Line.

History

In the Watford DC Line program of new electrified suburban tracks of the London and North Western Railway, a new station, "Harlesden", opened on 15 June 1912. Bakerloo line services on the same tracks began on 16 April 1917, via a new junction at Queens Park station. The Watford Junction to  modernisation project was completed in 1922.

Transport links
London bus routes 187, 206, 224, 226, 228, 260 and 487.

References

External links

Bakerloo line stations
Tube stations in the London Borough of Brent
DfT Category E stations
Railway stations in the London Borough of Brent
Former London and North Western Railway stations
Railway stations in Great Britain opened in 1912
Railway stations served by London Overground
1912 establishments in England